Hashmot ( – 10 November 2003) was a Bangladeshi film actor and director. He was known for acting in comic roles. He was also known as Haba Hashmot on the magazine television show Ityadi.

Biography
Hashmot acted in over 100 films. He acted in films like Nil Akasher Niche, Abujh Mon, Rangbaz, Alor Michil, Haba Hashmot and Notun Bou. Besides acting he also involved in film direction.

Hashmot died on 10 November 2003 at the age of 72.

Selected filmography

Actor
 Nil Akasher Niche
 Abujh Mon
 Rangbaz
 Alor Michil
 Haba Hashmot
 Notun Bou

Director
 Swapna Diye Ghera
 Ekhono Akash Nil
 Haba Hashmot
 Madhumita

References

External links

1930s births
2003 deaths
Bangladeshi male film actors
Bangladeshi film directors